The Government Law College, Thirunelveli is one of seven state government law colleges in the state of Tamil Nadu, India. Like the other law colleges in Tamil Nadu, it is administered by Tamil Nadu's Department of Legal Studies and affiliated to the Tamil Nadu Dr. Ambedkar Law University. At the beginning the college was running at Ponnusamy Pillai Bungalow located on Tiruchendur Road, Palayamcottai. Now the college is functioning in it newly constructed building.

The college was opened in 1996 joining existing government law colleges at Chennai, Madurai, Coimbatore and Trichy .

The college has undergraduate and graduate programs, and maintains two hostels for male and female students.

Popular culture
Mari Selvaraj directed the feature film Pariyerum Perumal, which takes place at Government Law College Thirunellveli, and was shot on campus.

References

Law schools in Tamil Nadu
Education in Tirunelveli
Educational institutions established in 1996
1996 establishments in Tamil Nadu